K. M. Khalid (born 4 August 1955) is a Bangladesh Awami League politician and the incumbent State Minister of Cultural Affairs. He is a Jatiya Sangsad member from the Mymensingh-5 constituency.

Personal life
Among Khalid's five brothers, M Hamid is the former director-general of Bangladesh Television and actor Mahmud Sajjad (d. 2021).

References

Living people
Awami League politicians
9th Jatiya Sangsad members
11th Jatiya Sangsad members
State Ministers of Cultural Affairs (Bangladesh)
Place of birth missing (living people)
1955 births
People from Mymensingh District